You Want It, You Got It is the second studio album by Canadian singer-songwriter Bryan Adams, released on 21 July 1981 by A&M Records.

Background and recording

This was the album that established the sound that Adams has retained throughout his recording career. Unlike Adams' debut album where he and Jim Vallance played most of the instruments themselves, You Want It You Got It was recorded live in the studio. The album was recorded at Le Studio in Morin-Heights, Quebec over a two-week period during the spring of 1981 and was mixed at The Power Station in New York City. The album was originally to be titled Bryan Adams Hasn't Heard Of You Either (due to critics' indifference to his first album and singles) but Adams' sense of humour didn't make it past the gatekeepers at the record company, who opted for the safer title.

Release and reception
The first single "Lonely Nights" became a hit in upstate New York long before it broke anywhere else. This was partially due to a couple of late night DJs working in Rochester, Albany and Syracuse. Record World said of "Lonely Nights" that Adams' "raspy tenor stretches with convincing emotion on the chorus flights and his hellbent guitar solo will attract the attention of AOR rockers."

Within a few months the album had been picked up across the United States and Adams was soon on tour doing clubs and noon hour concerts for radio stations, as well as support to such acts as The Kinks and Foreigner. The song eventually peaked at number 3 on the Billboard's Mainstream Rock Tracks chart, Adams' largest hit on that chart until "Run to You" in 1985, while peaking at number 84 on the Billboard Hot 100. Two further singles 'Coming Home' and 'Fits Ya Good' met with positive reviews by critics, the latter becoming Adams' first Top 40 hit in Canada, peaking at number 30, and at number 15 on the Billboard Mainstream Rock Tracks chart.

Several songs from the album have been recorded by other artists. Some examples are "Lonely Nights" by Uriah Heep, "Jealousy" by PRiSM, "Tonight" by Randy Meisner, and "Fits Ya Good" by Tove Naess, to name a few. The first recording of "Lonely Nights" was released by Ian Lloyd in 1980 on the album 3WC (Third World Civilization).

Track listing

Personnel
 Bryan Adams – lead and backing vocals, acoustic piano, guitars 
 Tommy Mandel – keyboards
 Jamie Glaser – guitar solos (5, 6, 8)
 G. E. Smith – guitar fills (6)
 Brian Stanley – bass 
 Mickey Curry – drums
 Jimmy Maelen – percussion
 John Gerber – saxophones
 Cindy Bullens – backing vocals (10)

Production
 Bryan Adams – producer 
 Bob Clearmountain – producer, recording, mixing
 Gary Rindfuss – recording assistant
 Paul Northfield – technical assistant
 Bob Ludwig – mastering
 Masterdisk (New York City, New York) – mastering location 
 Chuck Beeson – art direction
 Melanie Nissen – design 
 Lynn Goldsmith – photography 
 Bruce Allen – management

Charts

Certifications

References

1981 albums
Bryan Adams albums
A&M Records albums
Albums produced by Bob Clearmountain
Albums recorded at Le Studio